The 18' Dinghy was a sailing event on the Sailing at the 1920 Summer Olympics program in Ostend. Four races were scheduled. 2 sailors, on 1 boats, from 1 nation entered.

Race schedule

Course area

Weather conditions

Final results 
The 1920 Olympic scoring system was used. All competitors were male.

Notes 
 This was probably the least interesting race in the history of Olympic Sailing. Only one competitor showed up in one of the planned races and failed to finish.

Other information

18' Dinghy picture

Further reading

References 

18' Dinghy
18 foot dinghy